Punchlines was a comedy panel game show that aired on ITV from 3 January 1981 to 22 December 1984 and was hosted by Lennie Bennett. The show itself was based on a failed 1979 American game show pilot of the same name hosted by Bill Cullen, which in turn, was an attempted reboot of another American game show from 1966-69 called Eye Guess.

Format

Main Game
Each week, teams of a celebrity guest and a member of the public had to match the punchlines which were given by 8 other guests who were seated in Celebrity Squares style boxes to the questions that were asked by the host, and the first team to reach 150 points won the chance to win a major prize, while the losing contestant left with a Lennie Bennett doll in the first two series, then from series three onwards, they left with a case of champagne and some glasses.

At the beginning of each show, they would all look into the camera one at a time and introduce themselves. From the third series onwards, the Punchliners consisted of a mixture of the original Punchliners and more well known celebrities. The original Punchliners included Rose-Marie, Fogwell Flax, Bryan Joan Elliott, Aiden J. Harvey, Judy Gridley, Patti Gold and, making his first regular TV appearance, Matthew Kelly.

Bonus Round
In the final, round the winning contestant had to match seven of the eight punchlines correctly to win the star prize but if they failed to do so, they went away with the prize that corresponded to how many correct punchlines they had matched.

Australian version
A pilot for an Australian adaptation of the show, hosted by Jeremy Kewley was made for the Seven Network in 1986.

Transmissions

Series

Specials

References

External links

1980s British comedy television series
1981 British television series debuts
1984 British television series endings
1980s British game shows
ITV comedy
Television series by ITV Studios
London Weekend Television shows